The 1984 Toledo Rockets football team was an American football team that represented the University of Toledo in the Mid-American Conference (MAC) during the 1984 NCAA Division I-A football season. In their third season under head coach Dan Simrell, the Rockets compiled an 8–3–1 record (7–1–1 against MAC opponents), won the MAC championship, lost to L 13–30 vs. UNLV in the California Bowl (13–30), and outscored all opponents by a combined total of 187 to 164.

The team's statistical leaders included A. J. Sager with 1,647 passing yards, Steve Morgan with 1,291 rushing yards, and Eric Hutchinson with 451 receiving yards.

Schedule

References

Toledo
Toledo Rockets football seasons
Mid-American Conference football champion seasons
Toledo Rockets football